The striatopallidal fibres, also Wilson's pencils, pencil fibres of Wilson, and pencils of Wilson, are prominent myelinated fibres that connect the striatum to the globus pallidus.

Their distinctive appearance allows the putamen to be identified on light microscopy.

See also
Lentiform nucleus

References

Basal ganglia